Beloyarsky District  is an administrative and municipal district (raion), one of the nine in Khanty-Mansi Autonomous Okrug of Tyumen Oblast, Russia. It is located in the north of the autonomous okrug. Its administrative center is the town of Beloyarsky (which is not administratively a part of the district). Population: 9,766 (2010 Census);

Administrative and municipal status
Within the framework of administrative divisions, Beloyarsky District is one of the nine in the autonomous okrug. The town of Beloyarsky serves as its administrative center, despite being incorporated separately as a town of okrug significance—an administrative unit with the status equal to that of the districts.

As a municipal division, the district is incorporated as Beloyarsky Municipal District, with the town of okrug significance of Beloyarsky being incorporated within it as Beloyarsky Urban Settlement.

Geography
Lake Numto, a sacred place for the Khanty, is located in the district. The adjacent wetlands and the lake are part of an integrated  protected area which was established in 1997.

See also
Siberian Uvaly

References

Notes

Sources

Districts of Khanty-Mansi Autonomous Okrug
